Mouzillon is a commune in the Loire-Atlantique department in western France.

Population

Culture
Mouzillon is known as a producer of Muscadet wine as well as dry biscuit called the Petit Mouzillon. The two are traditionally consumed together.

See also
Communes of the Loire-Atlantique department

References

Communes of Loire-Atlantique